The Reverse of the Medal may refer to two novels:

 The Reverse of the Medal, a historical novel, eleventh in the Aubrey-Maturin series by Patrick O'Brien
The Reverse of the Medal, a 1923 silent war film
 Teleny, or The Reverse of the Medal, a Victorian pornographic novel sometimes attributed to Oscar Wilde